The 20th Avenue station is a local station on the BMT Sea Beach Line of the New York City Subway, located on 20th Avenue between 63rd and 64th Streets in the Bensonhurst neighborhood of Brooklyn. It is served by the N train at all times. During rush hours, several W and northbound Q trains also serve the station.

Station layout

This open-cut station opened on June 22, 1915. It has four tracks and two side platforms, but the two center express tracks are not normally used. The Coney Island-bound express track has been disconnected from the line and the Manhattan-bound track is signaled for trains in both directions. Both platforms are carved within the Earth's crust and made of concrete. They have beige walls and columns (the columns having previously painted blue-green), and the station signs are the standard black plates in white lettering. There are also some old lights that are out of use, and 1960s-era benches.

By September 2013, the Coney Island-bound tracks had been replaced with a new trackbed and rubber board protection. From January 18, 2016 to May 22, 2017, the Manhattan-bound platform at this station was closed for renovations. The Coney Island-bound platform was closed for a much longer period of time, from July 31, 2017 to July 1, 2019.

The 2019 artwork here is called Sea City Spin by David Storey. It features abstract glass mosaics based on Storey's experience of riding the BMT Sea Beach Line.

Exit
This station has one entrance/exit towards the east (railroad south) end. Two staircases from each platform go up to an enclosed concrete crossover before a set of doors lead to the waiting area of the stucco and tile station house. Outside the turnstile bank, there is a token booth and a set of doors leading to the east side of the 20th Avenue overpass/tunnel above the platforms and tracks.

Notes

References

External links 
 
 Station Reporter — N Train
 The Subway Nut — 20th Avenue Pictures 
 20th Avenue entrance from Google Maps Street View

BMT Sea Beach Line stations
New York City Subway stations in Brooklyn
Railway stations in the United States opened in 1915
1915 establishments in New York City
Bensonhurst, Brooklyn